St Dogmaels is a village, parish and community in Pembrokeshire, Wales, on the estuary of the River Teifi, a mile downstream from the town of Cardigan in neighbouring Ceredigion.  A little to the north of the village, further along the estuary, lies Poppit Sands beach. The parish includes the small settlement of Cippyn, south of Cemaes Head.

Name
The English and Welsh names seem to bear no similarity, but it has been suggested that possibly both names refer to the same saint or founder Dogmael (Dogfael), with ‘mael’ (prince) and ‘tud’ (land or people of) being added to Dog/doch as in Dog mael and Tud doch. It is the current standard usage not to have a full-stop after the 'St' or an apostrophe in 'Dogmaels'.

History
St Dogmaels Abbey is 12th-century Tironesian and was one of the richer monastic institutions in Wales. Adjacent to the abbey ruins is the parish church (Church in Wales) of St Thomas, which appears successively to have occupied at least three sites close to or within the abbey buildings.  The present building is a respectable minor Victorian edifice and contains the Ogam Sagranus stone.

St Dogmaels was once a marcher borough. George Owen of Henllys, in 1603, described it as one of five Pembrokeshire boroughs overseen by a portreeve. The parish appeared (as Sct. Dogmels) on a 1578 parish map of Pembrokeshire.

In the 1830s, the parish's population was 2,109, and fell into four areas: Cippyn, Abbey, Pant-y-groes and Bridgend. In 1832, boundary changes meant that a part of Pembrokeshire, including a part of St Dogmaels, was included in Cardiganshire. This was reversed by the Welsh Assembly in 2002.

There are more than 30 listed buildings in the parish, including the parish church, the abbey and the mediaeval flour mill, Y Felin.

In 2006, the village won the Wales Calor Village of the Year competition after beating Trefriw in the final.

Pembrokeshire Coast Path
The northern end of the Pembrokeshire Coast Path is often regarded as being at Poppit Sands, near St. Dogmaels, where the official plaque was originally sited but the path now continues to St. Dogmaels, where a new marker was unveiled in July 2009.  Here the path links with the Ceredigion Coast Path, which continues northwards as part of the Wales Coast Path.

Governance
An electoral ward of the same name exists, stretching to include the community of Nevern. The population taken at the 2011 census was 2,218.

Shakespeare in St Dogmaels Abbey 
A Shakespeare play is performed annually in the abbey during the summer since the first play was performed in 1987. The actors are both local and from all parts of Great Britain.

Twinning
St Dogmaels is twinned with the village of Trédarzec in Côtes-d'Armor, Brittany.

See also 
 Albro Castle, a former workhouse
 Calor Village of the Year

References

External links 

Further historical information and sources on GENUKI
Village website
Abbey Shakespeare Players
Photographs of St Dogmaels and surrounding area on Geograph

Villages in Pembrokeshire
Communities in Pembrokeshire